Museums have been created from many former jails and prisons.

Some old jails converted into museums are listed under the original name of the jail, especially if listed on the US National Register of Historic Places.  For example, see Old St. Johns County Jail in St Augustine, Florida.

Museums with a main purpose not associated with the jail or prison in which they are located are listed separately, below the main list.

See also
List of museums in the United States

References

Jail Museums

Museums